Robert Anthony "Tony" Diment (9 February 1927 – 18 June 2005) was an English cricketer who played for Gloucestershire in 1952 and for Leicestershire between 1955 and 1958. He was born at Tortworth, Gloucestershire and died at Leicester.

Diment was a right-handed middle-order batsman who was recruited by Leicestershire in 1955 as assistant secretary to the secretary/captain, Charles Palmer, and was therefore allowed to play as an amateur. He played in 59 first-class games for the county over the next four seasons, being a fairly regular member of the side in both 1957 and 1958. But although he passed 50 in six innings, his career batting average was only 16 and his highest first-class score was just 71, made in his first match for Leicestershire, against Derbyshire in 1955. He had earlier played a single match for his native Gloucestershire in 1952, without success.

Palmer retired as both player and secretary at the end of the 1957 season. Diment succeeded him as secretary, but Leicestershire recruited Willie Watson, the Yorkshire and England professional player, as captain from 1958. When Watson regained his Test place that season and also missed a few matches through injury, Diment captained the Leicestershire team in five games: they included the last game he played in first-class cricket.

Diment remained as the secretary of Leicestershire until after the 1959 season, but played only for the second eleven that year. In a Minor Counties Championship match against Shropshire in July 1959 he made an unbeaten 200 at more than a run a ball, astonishingly fast for an era of stodgy batsmanship. But at the end of that season he left Leicestershire to take a job in the leather industry.

References

External links

1927 births
2005 deaths
English cricketers
Gloucestershire cricketers
Leicestershire cricketers
English cricket administrators
People from South Gloucestershire District
Sportspeople from Gloucestershire